The Angelo Marre House, also known as Villa Marre, is a historic house at 1321 Scott Street in Little Rock, Arkansas.  It is a high style Italianate house, two stories in height, with a flared mansard roof and a -story tower set above its entry.  Built of painted brick, it has been a landmark of the city since its construction, and has had at least two notable occupants: Jeff Davis, a Governor of Arkansas, and Edgar Burton Kinsworthy, a state attorney general and long-serving state senator.

The house was listed on the National Register of Historic Places in 1970.

The home was used for exterior shots of Sugarbaker & Associates Interior Design on the television series Designing Women.

See also
National Register of Historic Places listings in Little Rock, Arkansas

References

Houses on the National Register of Historic Places in Arkansas
Italianate architecture in Arkansas
Houses completed in 1882
Houses in Little Rock, Arkansas
National Register of Historic Places in Little Rock, Arkansas
Historic district contributing properties in Arkansas